FTS and Hook-interacting protein (FHIP) also known as protein FAM160A2 is a protein that in humans is encoded by the FAM160A2 gene.

References

Further reading